"What I Didn't Do" is a song written by Wood Newton and Michael Noble, and recorded by American country music artist Steve Wariner.  It was released in December 1984 as the first single from the album One Good Night Deserves Another.  The song reached #3 on the Billboard Hot Country Singles & Tracks chart.

Chart performance

References

1984 singles
Steve Wariner songs
Song recordings produced by Tony Brown (record producer)
Songs written by Wood Newton
Song recordings produced by Jimmy Bowen
MCA Records singles
1984 songs